Anerastia gnathosella is a species of snout moth in the genus Anerastia. It was described by Hans Georg Amsel in 1954 and is known from Egypt.

References

Moths described in 1954
Anerastiini
Endemic fauna of Egypt
Moths of Africa